Michelle O'Connor was a Sinn Féin politician, who was elected to the Northern Ireland Peace Forum for Upper Bann in 1996.  She was the only Sinn Féin member elected for Upper Bann in that election. She left politics shortly afterwards.

References

Living people
Sinn Féin politicians
Members of the Northern Ireland Forum
Year of birth missing (living people)